The List of Serbian-language television channels includes the following channels:

Serbia

Other countries

Serbian